Gonzalo Alejandro Espinoza Toledo (born 9 April 1990), known as Gonzalo Espinoza, is a Chilean footballer who plays for Unión San Felipe as a midfielder.

Career statistics

International career
He got his first call up to the senior Chile squad for a friendly against the United States in January 2015 and made his international debut in the match.

Notes

References

External links
 
 

1990 births
Living people
People from Constitución, Chile
Association football midfielders
Chilean footballers
Chile international footballers
Chilean expatriate footballers
Tercera División de Chile players 
Chilean Primera División players
Argentine Primera División players
Süper Lig players
A.C. Barnechea footballers
Unión San Felipe footballers
Racing Club de Avellaneda footballers
Arsenal de Sarandí footballers
All Boys footballers
Universidad de Chile footballers
Club Atlético Patronato footballers
Kayserispor footballers
Unión Española footballers
Chilean expatriate sportspeople in Argentina
Chilean expatriate sportspeople in Turkey
Expatriate footballers in Argentina
Expatriate footballers in Turkey